Enola Holmes may refer to:

 Enola Holmes (character), a non-canonical younger sister of Sherlock Holmes created by author Nancy Springer
 The Enola Holmes Mysteries, the book series featuring the character
 Enola Holmes (film), a 2020 film based on the first book
 Enola Holmes 2, the 2022 sequel to the 2020 film